Mish Mish (also spelled Michmich) is a municipality in the Byblos District of  Keserwan-Jbeil Governorate, Lebanon. It is 60 kilometers north of Beirut. Mish Mish has an average elevation of 1,200 meters above sea level and a total land area of 1,471 hectares. Its inhabitants are predominantly Maronite Catholics.

References

Populated places in Byblos District
Maronite Christian communities in Lebanon